54321 may refer to:
 54321, a 2016 Tamil-language film
 "5-4-3-2-1", a song by Manfred Mann
 5-4-3 rule or 5-4-3-2-1 rule, an Ethernet design guideline
 Countdown, a sequence of backward counting towards a scheduled event
 "54321", a 2022 song by Offset